Antony J. Underwood is the founder and a former director of the ARC Special Research Centre on Ecological Impacts of Coastal Cities at the University of Sydney.  Tony has written extensively about the processes that cause patterns of distribution and abundance in organisms in coastal habitats. In 1985 he received a D.Sc. from the University of Bristol.

Tony is now an Emeritus Professor in the School of Biological Sciences at the University of Sydney.

Although formally retired, Tony is still actively writing and thinking about experimental ecology.

A short biography of Tony was published in 1996 by Professors M.G. Chapman and J. Grey.

References

Living people
Academic staff of the University of Sydney
Fellows of the Australian Academy of Science
Year of birth missing (living people)